Mesogobio is a genus of cyprinid fish that is found in Eastern Asia.  There are currently two described species.

Species
There are currently two recognized species in this genus:
 Mesogobio lachneri Bănărescu & Nalbant, 1973
 Mesogobio tumenensis Y. L. Chang, 1980

References

 
Cyprinid fish of Asia
Taxa named by Petre Mihai Bănărescu
Taxa named by Teodor T. Nalbant